bro'Town is a New Zealand adult animated comedy television series and sitcom that ran from 2004 to 2009. It starred David Fane, Mario Gaoa, Shimpal Lelisi and Oscar Kightley.

Overview 
The main characters in the series are five 14 year old Polynesian New Zealand boys who live in Morningside, Auckland, New Zealand. They attend the local college, St Sylvester's. It was New Zealand's first primetime animated television show and was very popular when it started in 2004 with 33 per cent of the viewing audience during its 8-8.30pm time slot for the first season. bro'Town is heavy with popular culture references, and is based on the comedy theatre group The Naked Samoans. The series has faced criticism often for being racist, for example every episode of the first season received complaints. The writers often describe the humour as being 'not PC' (politically correct) and is satire with characters being sent-up. One of the series writers Oscar Kightley says of the humour, "The only reason we get away with that irreverence and edgy stuff is because on the flipside is heart."

bro'Town has left a lasting legacy on popular culture in New Zealand driven by its urban Pacific Island culture.  It has been critically acclaimed "as hilarious and alarmingly true to life", studied at universities, and used for health messages in a cartoon booklet with information about rheumatic fever.

Production
Produced by New Zealand company Firehorse Films which was created by Elizabeth Mitchell for bro'Town and funded by New Zealand On Air. The lead designer was Ant Sang who was responsible for character, location and prop designs. bro'Town was made using three animation studios – two in New Zealand and one in India – and involved over 100 staff. The series was done in traditional ink and paint animation. The show satirises the boys' culture, with dialogue in the local vernacular. The series includes references to New Zealand literature, particularly the novels and short stories of Witi Ihimaera. The series has strong religious references, with most episodes starting with events between God, Jesus Christ and other historical figures, which leads to the theme of the episode and the subsequent events between the boys.

Characters

The Boys
 Vale Pepelo (Oscar Kightley)  – Brother of Valea Pepelo. He has a strong social conscience. Contrary to his given name, Vale is considered the intelligent one of the group, frequently seen carrying a literary classic.(Samoan)
 Valea Pepelo (Shimpal Lelisi) (Valea loosely translates to Dumber) – Brother of Vale Pepelo. He is more interested in girls than Vale. Whenever he sees an attractive girl, he does a rendition of the 'schwing!' gesture (peyow peyow!) Valea's name is an apt description. Valea has a description of "the pasher" after noting in a Bro' Town annual his goal in life is to "pash hot chicks" and his dream is for "hot chicks" that like to be "pashed". Although loosely translated to Dumber, Valea is known to be only slightly behind in the National Standards. Jeff da Maori is more likely to fail exams, and, if under correct conditions (getting hit by a bus, for example) Valea is amazingly intelligent.(Samoan)
 Sione Tapili (Mario Gaoa) – From A Tongan Descent, his mother is known as a Sheman and is also Vale and Valea's best friend. Sione is considered the rich and smart one of the group and considers himself as a ladies' man, while he constantly looking for ways to impress the girl of his dreams, sixth former Mila Jizovich. He is also the "bro" likely to have dream sequences e.g. posing as a super hero and starring in famous movies.(Tongan)
 Jeff da Māori (David Fane) – Jeff Da Māori lives with his mother and eight dads in a car shell outside the house. He is considered the clumsy and shy one by the group, He was brought up in the country by his aunt Queenie but then moved to the city for better TV reception and "because the thieving colonialist stole our land".  He is often portrayed with a horribly runny nose. He is known for his catchphrase 'Not Even Ow!' (meaning 'that ain't right'). He is also known to call many people his cousin, and claims "everyone's my cousin, except Winston Peters he's a 'dick' ow". He is known to be actual cousins with famous actress Keisha Castle-Hughes and famous actor Cliff Curtis. (Maori)
 Rodney David Damascus McCorkenstein-Taifule aka Mack (David Fane) – Mack rounds out the group as a heavyset boy with an effeminate demeanor and a knack for talking his way out of things.  Although he does stand behind his word eventually. Mack is considered the tough guy of the group, claiming to have been raised in the streets. He actually lives in a high class mansion with a loving mother and father. Mack's homosexual tendencies and feminine behaviour are more and more obvious as the show develops, but his friends seem to choose to ignore it. He is also known to be a snob at school, probably excelling at most subjects, and noted to be reading Memoirs of a Geisha. (Tongan/White)

Other characters of Morningside
 Pepelo Pepelo (David Fane) – Vale and Valea's dad is a benefit abusing, occasional fork-lift driver with a love of beer, pornography and gambling (aka "The Town Drunk"). His catchphrase is "I'm going to the pub... I may be some time". Pepelo's wife died when the boys were young and they were entrusted to his care. However, his method of child rearing was ignoring them to fend for themselves. The closest he inadvertently gets to parenting is occasionally telling the boys a relevant and touching story from his own life. He is known to discriminate against other ethnic minorities in Morningside, have frequent drunk-driving accidents and blame his dysfunctions on the war in Vietnam.
 Wong (David Fane) – Initially a Chinese exchange student from Hong Kong. After a rocky start he quickly became mates with the boys by sharing his wealth and letting them ride in his car. He once helped the Boys by joining in the St. Sylvester's rugby team in Get Rucked and bet a million dollars on Honky the Wonderhorse. Wong has a brother named White, who exists only to facilitate a racist pun about being unable to tell White from Wong.
 Constable "Bobby" Bababiba (Mario Gaoa) – A cynical and unsympathetic policeman who, being the only police officer to appear on the show, has been involved with many of the boys' mishaps as he tries to restore order in Morningside. His image and name are based on actor Robbie Magasiva.
 Rakeesh Maadkraklikka (Mario Gaoa) – A disgruntled Indo-Fijian dairy store owner. He is eager to shoot and zap any potential troublemaker or thief in his store. Pepelo owes a massive debt to Rakeesh's store due to his indulgence and improper spending. He is married to the beautiful Satisha.
 Satisha Maadkraklikka – Rakeesh's spouse. She is not as brash as her husband, but Satisha is just as tough. However, she shows a sympathetic side as well: on two occasions Satisha helped The Boys with their problems and issues.
 Reverend Minister (Vela Manusaute) – Stereotypical minister who heads a Samoan flock in Morningside. He frequently preaches about the local issues in very vivid and exaggerated ways (as was featured in Sione-rella and Touched by a Teacher). He is also quick to drive his flock on mindless angry mob sprees. As a sideline for his church he also sells 'authentic' holy items at high prices (like holy water and sheep-shaped caps). There seems to be an intimate relationship between him and Agnes. Agnes' youngest child has an uncanny resemblance to the minister, including his hairdo – for that matter, so do most of the very young children of his congregation. He is very similar to the Minister character in the recurring sketch Milburn Place, part of the Skitz comedy series in which several Naked Samoans were involved.
 Mahari Stevens (Vela Manusaute) – A Social worker from CYPFS -Children and Young Person's Family Services (a reference to the NZ CYFS -Children Youth and Family Services). She appeared in the first episode when Pepelo disappeared for four days, responding to a ten-year-old complaint about his terrible parenting, and made the Pepelo brothers "Wards of the State". She also later interrogated Mack and inadvertently manipulated him into accusing Brother Ken of child molestation, and threatened to take him away from his parents when he revealed it was in fact false.

Tapili family
 Agnes Esmeralda Beatrice fasi fufuTapili (David Fane) – Sione's mother and the Pepelos' neighbour. She is deeply religious and physically aggressive, especially to Sione (she refuses to show this side of her in public, though). Despite this, she seems to have intimate relations with the local minister. She serves as a caricature of the overbearing Polynesian mother who will not hesitate to humiliate her children. Willing for a husband, she is shown to have phone sex with Pepelo Pepelo, even though she is shown to hate him.
 Sina Tapili – (Teuila Blakely) – Sione's big sister and Mila's friend. Sina views her brother and the boys disdainfully, except for one time when Mack was crying. She attends St Cardinal's College for girls, known to the boys of neighbouring St. Sylvester's as 'Cardinal Knowledge.'
 Timothy "Motorcycle Boy" Tapili – Agnes' eldest son. He is a delinquent who is a regular in the local delinquent centre (which Agnes euphemistically calls a "boarding school") and jail. His real name and nature were exposed in the episode "Go and ask Agnes", where it is revealed that his criminal record is not very impressive and he behaves more like a pretentious bully than the "hardcore" criminal he claims to be. He is shown to be a role model to Sione and Sione states he wants a bike like him.
 Samson – Agnes' youngest son. He is the presumed son of the minister, though Agnes refers to him as "A miracle by Jesus".

School folk and students
 Brother Ken (David Fane) – St. Sylvester's Fa’afafine principal. He is a personal childhood friend of many famous New Zealanders, including actress Lucy Lawless and former prime minister of New Zealand, Helen Clark. Brother Ken is a caring and reasonable principal, and once helped a then-young Mack (a nickname created by Brother Ken) to become friends with the boys. Because the concept of Fa’afafine, a person in Samoa, American Samoa and the Samoan diaspora who identifies themselves as having a third gender or non-binary role, which ranges from extravagantly feminine to conventionally masculine, does not readily translate, when the series was broadcast on Adult Swim Latin America, a decision was made not to translate Samoan words and just present them as part of the "cultural journey".
 Rex Ruka – Rex is a typical sort of jock or alpha male in St. Sylvester's. He is regularly seen mocking the boys due to their supposed inferiority with Joost by his side. Rex is Sione's rival for Mila's hand.
 Joost van der Van Van (Oscar Kightley) – A South African immigrant whose father Hansje manages the local zoo. As is expected, he acts as Rex's partner, providing appreciation for his many putdowns (often saying "Hilarious!"). However, it was revealed in "A Chicken Roll at My Table" that Joost's racism was an act and he only did it because he was discouraged by his grandfather from making friends with coloured people. His name is a nonsense parody of Dutch surnames and means 'of the of.' Although unknown, it has been suggested that his name may have been derived from Springbok player Joost van der Westhuizen.
 Mila Jizovich – A Croatian student of St. Cardinal's, best friends with Sina Tapili and Sione’s crush. She is best known for helping Lucy Lawless with the birth control presentation in "Sionerella". Her name appears to be a combination of tribute to the actress Milla Jovovich and a somewhat unsavoury joke.
 Abo (Abercrombie Smith the Third) – An Aboriginal Australian who studies in St. Sylvester's. His nickname is either derived from his ethnicity or his real name, Abercrombie. Abo is known to celebrate every occasion with a (often very long) traditional song or dance. He is often seen riding an emu. Though Abo has made political comments regarding Indigenous native title, the satirical point of this character is unclear as very few Aboriginal Australians live in New Zealand. As such, he is more surreal than satirical.
 Ms. Lynn Grey – A teacher who manages The Boys' class at St. Sylvester's. She seems to have an affection for Māori men (as is shown in "A Māori at my Table"). A parody of well-meaning liberal Anglo-Saxon, she will carefully use Māori vocabulary but immediately follow it with a slightly patronising English explanation. Her name is a reference to the Auckland suburb of Grey Lynn.

Figures in Heaven
 God (Mario Gaoa) – As the creator of the universe, God can choose to be anything he wants. Thus he is satirically portrayed as a well-built Pacific Islander in a lavalava. He appears mellow and easy-going, rather than strict and wrathful. God starts each episode in Heaven as if it were a fairy-tale, usually telling it to Jesus Christ and other famous, deceased notable figures.
 Jesus (Shimpal Lelisi) – The Lord's only son. Unlike the past serious and solemn renditions of the Christian divinity, Bro'Town portrays him as young and naive (despite his past mortal life more than 2000 years ago). He generally seems like a somewhat wimpish teenager, who often needs to be gently taught a lesson by his Father.

There are also two female angels Angelina and Angelita.

Occasionally, deceased relatives such as Pepelo's wife (Vale and Valea's mother), or Jeff da Maori's Auntie Queenie are featured, appearing in dreams to communicate with the living.

Guest stars
bro'Town frequently features special guests – notable celebrities from politics, art, culture, music, the media, business and sport. The most regular cameos are John Campbell and Carol Hirschfeld, newsreaders from TV3 at the time. Former All Blacks and Manu Samoa player Michael Jones plays the P.E. teacher at St Sylvester's. Former New Zealand Prime Minister Helen Clark has appeared in all seasons except the last and rapper Scribe has been a guest on five seasons of bro'Town. A feature of the series are cameos of people playing themselves. This includes Russell Crowe, Rove McManus, Robyn Malcolm, Neil and Tim Finn, Lucy Lawless, Flight of the Conchords, H.R.H. Charles, Prince of Wales, Sir Howard Morrison, Keisha Castle-Hughes and Madeline Sami.

Awards 

While it was running the series bro-Town was often nominated at New Zealand film and television awards in a range of categories. It won the following awards:

 2005 New Zealand Screen Awards – Best Comedy Programme, Best Comedy Script – Television: episode 6, 'The Weakest Link' – Mario Gaoa, David Fane, Mario Gaoa, Oscar Kightley, Shimpal Lelisi and Elizabeth Mitchell
 2005 Qantas Television Awards – Best Comedy Programme
 2006 Air New Zealand Screen Awards – Best Comedy Programme, Comedy Script – Television: episode 2.6, 'Touched by a Teacher' – Oscar Kightley, Mario Gaoa, David Fane, Shimpal Lelisi, Elizabeth Mitchell, Production Design: Ant Sang
 2007 Air New Zealand Screen Awards – Best Comedy Programme: Episode 3.2, 'Know Me Before'
 2008 Qantas Film and Television Awards – Achievement in Production Design – Television: Ant Sang

Books

DVD releases

References

External links
 The bro'Town official website
 

New Zealand adult animated comedy television series
Television shows funded by NZ on Air
2004 in New Zealand television
Black cartoons
2004 New Zealand television series debuts
2009 New Zealand television series endings
Three (TV channel) original programming
Television shows set in Auckland
2000s adult animated television series